Hydrogen production is the family of industrial methods for generating hydrogen gas. As of 2020, the majority of hydrogen (∼95%) is produced from fossil fuels by steam reforming of natural gas and other light hydrocarbons, partial oxidation of heavier hydrocarbons, and coal gasification. Other methods of hydrogen production include biomass gasification, zero-CO2-emission methane pyrolysis, and electrolysis of water. The latter processes, methane pyrolysis as well as water electrolysis can be done directly with any source of electricity, such as solar power.
 
The production of hydrogen plays a key role in any industrialized society, since hydrogen is required for many essential chemical processes. In 2020, roughly 87 million tons of hydrogen was produced worldwide for various uses, such as oil refining, in the production of ammonia through the Haber process, and in the production of methanol through reduction of carbon monoxide. The global hydrogen generation market was valued at US$135.94 billion in 2021, and expected to grow to US$219.2 billion by 2030, with a compound annual growth rate (CAGR) of 5.4% from 2021 to 2030.

Methods of hydrogen production

There are four main sources for the commercial production of hydrogen: natural gas, oil, coal, and electrolysis; which account for 48%, 30%, 18% and 4% of the world's hydrogen production respectively. Fossil fuels are the dominant source of industrial hydrogen. Carbon dioxide can be separated from natural gas with a 70–85% efficiency for hydrogen production and from other hydrocarbons to varying degrees of efficiency. Specifically, bulk hydrogen is usually produced by the steam reforming of methane or natural gas.

Steam methane reforming

Steam methane reforming (SMR) is a method of producing hydrogen from natural gas, which is mostly methane (CH4). It is currently the cheapest source of industrial hydrogen. Nearly 50% of the world's hydrogen is being produced by this method. The resulting endothermic reaction breaks up the methane molecules and forms carbon monoxide and molecular hydrogen (H2).

The carbon monoxide gas can then be passed with steam over iron oxide or other oxides and undergo a water-gas shift reaction to obtain further quantities of H2. The downside to this process is that its byproducts are major atmospheric release of CO2, CO and other greenhouse gases. Depending on the quality of the feedstock (natural gas, rich gases, naphtha, etc.), one ton of hydrogen produced will also produce 9 to 12 tons of CO2, a greenhouse gas that may be captured.

For this process, high temperature steam (H2O) reacts with methane (CH4) in an endothermic reaction to yield syngas.

CH4 + H2O   →   CO  +  3 H2

In a second stage, additional hydrogen is generated through the lower-temperature, exothermic, water-gas shift reaction, performed at about :

CO + H2O → CO2 + H2

Essentially, the oxygen (O) atom is stripped from the additional water (steam) to oxidize CO to CO2. This oxidation also provides energy to maintain the reaction.  Additional heat required to drive the process is generally supplied by burning some portion of the methane.

Other fossil fuel methods

Methane pyrolysis

Pyrolysis of methane is a hydrogen production process from natural gas. Hydrogen separation occurs in one step via flow through a molten metal catalyst in a "bubble column". It is a "no-greenhouse-gas" approach for potentially low-cost hydrogen production being measured for its capability to scale up and for operation at scale.

The process is conducted at higher temperatures (1065 °C or 1950 °F). Other forms of methane pyrolysis, such as the thermo-catalytic decomposition of methane, however, are able to operate at a reduced temperature between 600 °C - 1000 °C depending on the chosen catalyst.

 (g) → C(s) + 2 (g) ΔH° = 74.8 kJ/mol

The industrial quality solid carbon can then be sold as manufacturing feedstock or landfilled, it is not released into the atmosphere and does not pollute groundwater in landfills.

Partial oxidation
Hydrogen production from heavy hydrocarbons, which are unsuitable for catalytic steam reforming, is achieved by partial oxidation. A fuel-air or fuel-oxygen mixture is partially combusted, resulting in a hydrogen- and carbon monoxide-rich syngas. More hydrogen and carbon dioxide are then obtained from carbon monoxide (and water) via the water-gas shift reaction.  Carbon dioxide can be co-fed to lower the hydrogen to carbon monoxide ratio.

The partial oxidation reaction occurs when a substoichiometric fuel-air mixture or fuel-oxygen is partially combusted in a reformer or partial oxidation reactor. A distinction is made between thermal partial oxidation (TPOX) and catalytic partial oxidation (CPOX). The chemical reaction takes the general form:

CnHm + n/2 O2 → n CO + m/2 H2

Idealized examples for heating oil and coal, assuming compositions C12H24 and C24H12 respectively, are as follows:
C12H24 + 6 O2 → 12 CO + 12 H2
C24H12 + 12 O2 → 24 CO + 6 H2

Plasma reforming 
The Kværner process or Kvaerner carbon black & hydrogen process (CB&H) is a plasma reforming method, developed in the 1980s by a Norwegian company of the same name, for the production of hydrogen and carbon black from liquid hydrocarbons (CnHm). Of the available energy of the feed, approximately 48% is contained in the hydrogen, 40% is contained in activated carbon and 10% in superheated steam. CO2 is not produced in the process.

A variation of this process is presented in 2009 using, plasma arc waste disposal technology for the production of hydrogen, heat and carbon from methane and natural gas in a plasma converter.

Coal 
For the production of hydrogen from coal, coal gasification is used. The process of coal gasification uses steam and oxygen to break molecular bonds in coal and form a gaseous mixture of hydrogen and carbon monoxide. Carbon dioxide and pollutants may be more easily removed from gas obtained from coal gasification versus coal combustion.  Another method for conversion is low-temperature and high-temperature coal carbonization.

Coke oven gas made from pyrolysis (oxygen free heating) of coal has about 60% hydrogen, the rest being methane, carbon monoxide, carbon dioxide, ammonia, molecular nitrogen, and hydrogen sulfide (H2S).  Hydrogen can be separated from other impurities by the pressure-swing adsorption process.  Japanese steel companies have carried out production of hydrogen by this method.

Petroleum coke 
Petroleum coke can also be converted to hydrogen-rich syngas via coal gasification. The produced syngas consists mainly of hydrogen, carbon monoxide and H2S from the sulfur in the coke feed. Gasification is an option for producing hydrogen from almost any carbon source.

Depleted oil wells 
Injecting appropriate microbes into depleted oil wells allows them to extract hydrogen from the remaining, unrecoverable oil. Since the only inputs are the microbes, production costs are low. The method also produces concentrated  that needs to be captured and stored.

From water

Methods to produce hydrogen without the use of fossil fuels involve the process of water splitting, or splitting the water molecule (H2O) into its components oxygen and hydrogen. When the source of energy for water splitting is renewable or low-carbon, the hydrogen produced is sometimes referred to as green hydrogen. The conversion can be accomplished in several ways, but all methods are generally more expensive than fossil-fuel based production methods.

Electrolysis

Around 8 GW of electrolysis capacity is installed worldwide in 2020, accounting for around 4% of global hydrogen production.

Electrolysis consists of using electricity to split water into hydrogen and oxygen. Electrolysis of water is 70–80% efficient (a 20–30% conversion loss) while steam reforming of natural gas has a thermal efficiency between 70 and 85%. The electrical efficiency of electrolysis is expected to reach 82–86% before 2030, while also maintaining durability as progress in this area continues apace.

The difference between the two methods is the primary energy used; either electricity (for electrolysis) or natural gas (for steam methane reforming). Due to their use of water, a readily available resource, electrolysis and similar water-splitting methods have attracted the interest of the scientific community. With the objective of reducing the cost of hydrogen production, renewable sources of energy have been targeted to allow electrolysis.

There are three main types of electrolytic cells, solid oxide electrolyser cells (SOECs), polymer electrolyte membrane cells (PEM) and alkaline electrolysis cells (AECs). Traditionally, alkaline electrolysers are cheaper in terms of investment (they generally use nickel catalysts), but less-efficient; PEM electrolysers, conversely, are more expensive (they generally use expensive platinum group metal catalysts) but are more efficient and can operate at higher current densities, and can therefore be possibly cheaper if the hydrogen production is large enough.

At these high temperatures, a significant amount of the energy required can be provided as thermal energy (heat), and as such is termed high-temperature electrolysis. The heat energy can be provided from a number of different sources, including waste industrial heat, nuclear power stations or concentrated solar thermal plants. This has the potential to reduce the overall cost of the hydrogen produced by reducing the amount of electrical energy required for electrolysis.

PEM electrolysis cells typically operate below . These cells have the advantage of being comparatively simple and can be designed to accept widely varying voltage inputs, which makes them ideal for use with renewable sources of energy such as photovoltaic solar panels. AECs optimally operate at high concentrations of electrolyte (KOH or potassium carbonate) and at high temperatures, often near .

Industrial output and efficiency
Efficiency of modern hydrogen generators is measured by energy consumed per standard volume of hydrogen (MJ/m3), assuming standard temperature and pressure of the H2. The lower the energy used by a generator, the higher would be its efficiency; a 100%-efficient electrolyser would consume  of hydrogen, .  Practical electrolysis typically uses a rotating electrolyser, where centrifugal force helps separate gas bubbles from water. Such an electrolyser at 15 bar pressure may consume , and a further  if the hydrogen is compressed for use in hydrogen cars.

Conventional alkaline electrolysis has an efficiency of about 70%, however advanced alkaline water electrolyser with efficiency of up to 82% are available. Accounting for the use of the higher heat value (because inefficiency via heat can be redirected back into the system to create the steam required by the catalyst), average working efficiencies for PEM electrolysis are around 80%, or 82% using the most modern alkaline electrolysers.

PEM efficiency is expected to increase to approximately 86% before 2030. Theoretical efficiency for PEM electrolysers is predicted up to 94%.

As of 2020, the cost of hydrogen by electrolysis is around $3–8/kg. Considering the industrial production of hydrogen, and using current best processes for water electrolysis (PEM or alkaline electrolysis) which have an effective electrical efficiency of 70–82%, producing 1 kg of hydrogen (which has a specific energy of 143 MJ/kg or about 40 kWh/kg) requires 50–55 kWh of electricity. At an electricity cost of $0.06/kWh, as set out in the Department of Energy hydrogen production targets for 2015, the hydrogen cost is $3/kg.

The US DOE target price for hydrogen in 2020 is $2.30/kg, requiring an electricity cost of $0.037/kWh, which is achievable given recent PPA tenders for wind and solar in many regions. The report by IRENA.ORG is an extensive factual report of present-day industrial hydrogen production consuming about 53 to 70  kWh per kg could go down to about 45 kWh/kg . The thermodynamic energy required for hydrogen by electrolysis  translates to 33 kWh/kg, which is higher than steam reforming with carbon capture and higher than methane pyrolysis.
One of the advantages of electrolysis over hydrogen from steam methane reforming (SMR) is that the hydrogen can be produced on-site, meaning that the costly process of delivery via truck or pipeline is avoided.

Steam methane reforming is between $1–3/kg on average. This makes production of hydrogen via electrolysis cost competitive in many regions already, as outlined by Nel Hydrogen and others, including an article by the IEA examining the conditions which could lead to a competitive advantage for electrolysis.

Chemically assisted electrolysis 
In addition to reduce the voltage required for electrolysis via the increasing of the temperature of the electrolysis cell it is also possible to electrochemically consume the oxygen produced in an electrolyser by introducing a fuel (such as carbon/coal, methanol, ethanol, formic acid,  glycerol, etc.) into the oxygen side of the reactor. This reduces the required electrical energy and has the potential to reduce the cost of hydrogen to less than 40~60% with the remaining energy provided in this manner.

Carbon/hydrocarbon assisted water electrolysis (CAWE) has the potential to offer a less energy intensive, cleaner method of using chemical energy in various sources of carbon, such as low-rank and high sulfur coals, biomass, alcohols and methane (Natural Gas), where pure CO2 produced can be easily sequestered without the need for separation.

Radiolysis
Nuclear radiation can break water bonds through radiolysis. In the Mponeng gold mine, South Africa, researchers found bacteria in a naturally occurring high radiation zone. The bacterial community which was dominated by a new phylotype of Desulfotomaculum, was feeding on primarily radiolytically produced hydrogen.

Thermolysis
Water spontaneously dissociates at around 2500 °C, but this thermolysis occurs at temperatures too high for usual process piping and equipment resulting in a rather low commercialization potential.

Thermolysis via solar energy 
Hydrogen production via water thermolysis based on solar energy involves using solar concentrators to directly collect solar energy to heat water to 2500 K, at which temperature it decomposes into H2 and O2. The heating temperature can be reduced by applying catalysts which allow the water decomposition by steps with lower energy.

Pyrolysis on biomass 
Pyrolysis can be divided into different types based on the pyrolysis temperature, namely low-temperature slow pyrolysis, medium-temperature rapid pyrolysis, and high-temperature flash pyrolysis. The source energy is mainly solar energy, with help of photosynthetic microorganisms to decompose water or biomass to produce hydrogen. However, this process has relatively low hydrogen yields and high operating cost. It is not a feasible method for industry.

Nuclear-assisted thermolysis 
The high-temperature gas-cooled reactor (HTGR) is one of the most promising CO2-free nuclear technique to produce hydrogen by splitting water in a large scale. In this method, iodine-sulfur (IS) thermo-chemical cycle for splitting water and high-temperature steam electrolysis (HTSE) were selected as the main processes for nuclear hydrogen production. The S-I cycle follows three chemical reactions:

Bunsen reaction: I2+SO2+2H2O=H2SO4+2HI

HI decomposition: 2HI=H2+I2

Sulfuric acid decomposition: H2SO4=SO2+1/2O2+H2O

The hydrogen production rate of HTGR with IS cycle is approximately 0.68 kg/s, and the capital cost to build a unit of power plant is $100 million.

Thermochemical cycle

Thermochemical cycles combine solely heat sources (thermo) with chemical reactions to split water into its hydrogen and oxygen components. The term cycle is used because aside from water, hydrogen and oxygen, the chemical compounds used in these processes are continuously recycled. If electricity is partially used as an input, the resulting thermochemical cycle is defined as a hybrid one.

The sulfur-iodine cycle (S-I cycle) is a thermochemical cycle processes which generates hydrogen from water with an efficiency of approximately 50%.  The sulfur and iodine used in the process are recovered and reused, and not consumed by the process.  The cycle can be performed with any source of very high temperatures, approximately 950 °C, such as by Concentrating solar power systems (CSP) and is regarded as being well suited to the production of hydrogen by high-temperature nuclear reactors, and as such, is being studied in the High-temperature engineering test reactor in Japan. There are other hybrid cycles that use both high temperatures and some electricity, such as the Copper–chlorine cycle, it is classified as a hybrid thermochemical cycle because it uses an electrochemical reaction in one of the reaction steps, it operates at 530 °C and has an efficiency of 43 percent.

Ferrosilicon method
Ferrosilicon is used by the military to quickly produce hydrogen for balloons. The chemical reaction uses sodium hydroxide, ferrosilicon, and water. The generator is small enough to fit a truck and requires only a small amount of electric power, the materials are stable and not combustible, and they do not generate hydrogen until mixed. The method has been in use since World War I.  A heavy steel pressure vessel is filled with sodium hydroxide and ferrosilicon, closed, and a controlled amount of water is added; the dissolving of the hydroxide heats the mixture to about 93 °C and starts the reaction; sodium silicate, hydrogen and steam are produced.

Photobiological water splitting

Biological hydrogen can be produced in an algae bioreactor. In the late 1990s it was discovered that if the algae are deprived of sulfur it will switch from the production of oxygen, i.e. normal photosynthesis, to the production of hydrogen. It seems that the production is now economically feasible by surpassing the 7–10 percent energy efficiency (the conversion of sunlight into hydrogen) barrier. with a hydrogen production rate of 10–12 ml per liter culture per hour.

Photocatalytic water splitting

The conversion of solar energy to hydrogen by means of water splitting process is one of the most interesting ways to achieve clean and renewable energy systems. However, if this process is assisted by photocatalysts suspended directly in water instead of using photovoltaic and an electrolytic system the reaction is in just one step, it can be made more efficient.

Biohydrogen routes 

Biomass and waste streams can in principle be converted into biohydrogen with biomass gasification, steam reforming, or biological conversion like biocatalysed electrolysis or fermentative hydrogen production.

Among hydrogen production methods such as steam methane reforming, thermal cracking, coal and biomass gasification and pyrolysis, electrolysis, and photolysis, biological ones are more eco-friendly and less energy intensive. In addition, a wide variety of waste and low-value materials such as agricultural biomass as renewable sources can be utilized to produce hydrogen via biochemical pathways. Nevertheless, at present hydrogen is produced mainly from fossil fuels, in particular, natural gas which are non-renewable sources. Hydrogen is not only the cleanest fuel but also widely used in a number of industries, especially fertilizer, petrochemical and food ones.

This makes it logical to investigate alternative sources for hydrogen production. The main biochemical technologies to produce hydrogen are dark and photo fermentation processes. In dark fermentation, carbohydrates are converted to hydrogen by fermentative microorganisms including strict anaerobe and facultative anaerobe bacteria. A theoretical maximum of 4 mol H2/mol glucose can be produced and, besides hydrogen, sugars are converted to volatile fatty acids (VFAs) and alcohols as by-products during this process. Photo fermentative bacteria are able to generate hydrogen from VFAs. Hence, metabolites formed in dark fermentation can be used as feedstock in photo fermentation to enhance the overall yield of hydrogen.

Fermentative hydrogen production 

Biohydrogen can be produced in bioreactors. The process involves bacteria consuming hydrocarbons and producing hydrogen and CO2. The CO2 and hydrogen can be separated.

Fermentative hydrogen production is the fermentative conversion of organic substrate to biohydrogen manifested by a diverse group of bacteria using multi enzyme systems involving three steps similar to anaerobic conversion. Dark fermentation reactions do not require light energy, so they are capable of constantly producing hydrogen from organic compounds throughout the day and night. Photofermentation differs from dark fermentation because it only proceeds in the presence of light. For example, photo-fermentation with Rhodobacter sphaeroides SH2C can be employed to convert small molecular fatty acids into hydrogen.

Fermentative hydrogen production can be done using direct biophotolysis by green algae, indirect biophotolysis by cyanobacteria, photo-fermentation by anaerobic photosynthetic bacteria and dark fermentation by anaerobic fermentative bacteria. For example, studies on hydrogen production using H. salinarium, an anaerobic photosynthetic bacteria, coupled to a hydrogenase donor like E. coli,  are reported in literature.  Enterobacter aerogenes is another hydrogen producer.

Enzymatic hydrogen generation 
Diverse enzymatic pathways have been designed to generate hydrogen from sugars.

Biocatalysed electrolysis 

Besides dark fermentation, electrohydrogenesis (electrolysis using microbes) is another possibility. Using microbial fuel cells, wastewater or plants can be used to generate power. Biocatalysed electrolysis should not be confused with biological hydrogen production, as the latter only uses algae and with the latter, the algae itself generates the hydrogen instantly, where with biocatalysed electrolysis, this happens after running through the microbial fuel cell and a variety of aquatic plants can be used. These include reed sweetgrass, cordgrass, rice, tomatoes, lupines and algae.

Nanogalvanic aluminum alloy powder 

An aluminum alloy powder invented by the U.S. Army Research Laboratory in 2017 was shown to be capable of producing hydrogen gas upon contact with water or any liquid containing water due to its unique nanoscale galvanic microstructure. It reportedly generates hydrogen at 100 percent of the theoretical yield without the need for any catalysts, chemicals, or externally supplied power.

CC-HOD 

Environmental impact
As of 2020, most hydrogen is produced from fossil fuels, resulting in carbon dioxide emissions. This is often referred to as grey hydrogen when emissions are released to the atmosphere, and blue hydrogen when emissions are captured through carbon capture and storage (CCS). Blue hydrogen has been estimated to have a greenhouse gas footprint 20% greater than burning gas or coal for heat and 60% greater when compared to burning diesel for heat, assuming US up- and mid-stream methane leakage rates and production via steam methane reformers (SMR) retrofitted with carbon dioxide capture.

The use of autothermal reformers (ATR) with integrated capture of carbon dioxide allows higher capture rates at satisfactory energy efficiencies and life cycle assessments have shown lower greenhouse gas emissions for such plants compared to SMRs with carbon dioxide capture. Application of ATR technology with integrated capture of carbon dioxide in Europe has been assessed to have a lower greenhouse gas footprint than burning natural gas, e.g. for the H21 project with a reported reduction of 68% due to a reduced carbon dioxide intensity of natural gas combined with a more suitable reactor type for capture of carbon dioxide.

Hydrogen produced using the newer, non-polluting technology methane pyrolysis is often referred to as turquoise hydrogen. High quality hydrogen is produced directly  from natural gas and the associated non-polluting solid carbon is not released into the atmosphere and can then be sold for industrial use or stored in landfill.

Hydrogen produced from renewable energy sources is often referred to as green hydrogen. There are two practical ways of producing hydrogen from renewable energy sources. One is to use power to gas, in which electric power is used to produce hydrogen from electrolysis of water, and the other is to use landfill gas to produce hydrogen in a steam reformer. Hydrogen fuel, when produced by renewable sources of energy like wind or solar power, is a renewable fuel. Hydrogen produced from nuclear energy via electrolysis is sometimes viewed as a subset of green hydrogen, but can also be referred to as pink hydrogen. The Oskarshamn Nuclear Power Plant made an agreement in January 2022 to supply commercial pink hydrogen in the order of kilograms per day.

, estimated costs of production are $1–1.80/kg for grey hydrogen and  blue hydrogen, and $2.50–6.80 for green hydrogen.

94 million tonnes of grey hydrogen are currently produced globally using fossil fuels as of 2022, primarily natural gas, and are therefore a significant source of greenhouse gas emissions.

Use of hydrogen

Hydrogen is used for the conversion of heavy petroleum fractions into lighter ones via hydrocracking.  It is also used in other processes including the aromatization process, hydrodesulfurization and the production of ammonia via the Haber process, the primary industrial method for the production of synthetic nitrogen fertilizer for growing 47 percent of food worldwide.

Hydrogen may be used in fuel cells for local electricity generation or potentially as a transportation fuel.

Hydrogen is produced as a by-product of industrial chlorine production by electrolysis. Although requiring expensive technologies, hydrogen can be cooled, compressed and purified for use in other processes on site or sold to a customer via pipeline, cylinders or trucks. The discovery and development of less expensive methods of production of bulk hydrogen is relevant to the establishment of a hydrogen economy.

See also 

 Ammonia production
 Artificial photosynthesis
 Biohydrogen
 Hydrogen analyzer
 Hydrogen compressor
 
 Hydrogen embrittlement
 Hydrogen leak testing
 Hydrogen pipeline transport
 Hydrogen purifier
 Hydrogen purity
 Hydrogen safety
 Hydrogen sensor
 Hydrogen storage
 Hydrogen station
 Hydrogen tank
 Hydrogen tanker
 Hydrogen technologies
 Hydrogen valve
 Industrial gas
 Liquid hydrogen
 Next Generation Nuclear Plant (partly for hydrogen production)
 Hy4Heat
 Lane hydrogen producer
 Linde–Frank–Caro process
 Underground hydrogen storage

References

Further reading